Albert the Bear (1100 – 18 November 1170) was the first margrave of Brandenburg from 1157 to his death and was briefly duke of Saxony between 1138 and 1142.

Life
Albert was the only son of Otto, Count of Ballenstedt, and Eilika, daughter of Magnus Billung, Duke of Saxony.  He inherited his father's valuable estates in northern Saxony in 1123, and on his mother's death, in 1142, succeeded to one-half of the lands of the house of Billung. Albert was a loyal vassal of his relation, Lothar I, Duke of Saxony, from whom, about 1123, he received the Margraviate of Lusatia, to the east; after Lothar became King of the Germans, he accompanied him on a disastrous expedition to Bohemia against the upstart, Soběslav I, Duke of Bohemia in 1126 at the Battle of Kulm, where he suffered a short imprisonment.

Albert's entanglements in Saxony stemmed from his desire to expand his inherited estates there. After the death of his brother-in-law, Henry II, Margrave of the Nordmark, who controlled a small area on the Elbe called the Saxon Northern March, in 1128, Albert, disappointed at not receiving this fief himself, attacked Udo V, Count of Stade, the heir, and was consequently deprived of Lusatia by Lothar. Udo, however, was said to have been assassinated by servants of Albert on 15 March 1130 near Aschersleben. In spite of this, Albert went to Italy in 1132 in the train of the king, and his services there were rewarded in 1134 by the investiture of the Northern March, which was again without a ruler.

In 1138 Conrad III, the Hohenstaufen King of the Germans, deprived Albert's cousin and nemesis, Henry the Proud, of his Saxon duchy, which was awarded to Albert if he could take it. After some initial success in his efforts to take possession, Albert was driven from Saxony, and also from his Northern March by a combined force of Henry and Jaxa of Köpenick, and compelled to take refuge in south Germany. Henry died in 1139 and an arrangement was found. Henry's son, Henry the Lion, received the duchy of Saxony in 1142. In the same year, Albert renounced the Saxon duchy and received the counties of Weimar and Orlamünde.

Once he was firmly established in the Northern March, Albert's covetous eye lay also on the thinly populated lands to the north and east. For three years he was occupied in campaigns against the Slavic Wends, who as pagans were considered fair game, and whose subjugation to Christianity was the aim of the Wendish Crusade of 1147 in which Albert took part. Albert was a part of the army that besieged Demmin, and at the end of the war, recovered Havelberg, which had been lost since 983. Diplomatic measures were more successful, and by an arrangement made with the last of the Wendish princes of Brandenburg, Pribislav-Henry of the Hevelli, Albert secured this district when the prince died in 1150. Taking the title "Margrave in Brandenburg", he pressed the crusade against the Wends, extended the area of his mark, encouraged Dutch and German settlement in the Elbe-Havel region (Ostsiedlung), established bishoprics under his protection, and so became the founder of the Margraviate of Brandenburg in 1157, which his heirs — the House of Ascania — held until the line died out in 1320.

In 1158 a feud with Henry the Lion, Duke of Saxony, was interrupted by a pilgrimage to the Holy Land. On his return in 1160, he, with the consent of his sons, Siegfried not being mentioned, donated land to the Knights of Saint John in memory of his wife, Sofia, at Werben on the Elbe. Around this same time, he minted a pfennig in memory of his deceased wife. In 1162 Albert accompanied Emperor Frederick Barbarossa to Italy, where he distinguished himself at the storming of Milan.

In 1164 Albert joined a league of princes formed against Henry the Lion, and peace being made in 1169, Albert divided his territories among his six sons. He died on 13 November 1170, and was buried at Ballenstedt.

Cognomen

Albert's personal qualities won for him the cognomen of the Bear, "not from his looks or qualities, for he was a tall handsome man, but from the cognisance on his shield, an able man, had a quick eye as well as a strong hand, and could pick what way was straightest among crooked things, was the shining figure and the great man of the North in his day, got much in the North and kept it, got Brandenburg for one there, a conspicuous country ever since," says Thomas Carlyle, who called Albert "a restless, much-managing, wide-warring man."  He is also called by later writers "the Handsome."

Marriage and children
Albert was married in 1124 to Sophie of Winzenburg (died 25 March 1160) and they had the following children:
 Otto I, Margrave of Brandenburg (1126/1128–7 March 1184)
 Count Hermann I of Orlamünde (died 1176), father of Siegfried III, Count of Weimar-Orlamünde
 Siegfried (died 24 October 1184), Bishop of Brandenburg from 1173 to 1180, Prince-Archbishop of Bremen, the first ranked prince, from 1180 to 1184
 Heinrich (died 1185), a canon in Magdeburg
 Count Albert of Ballenstedt (died after 6 December 1172)
 Count Dietrich of Werben (died after 5 September 1183)
 Count Bernhard of Anhalt (1134–9 February 1212), Duke of Saxony from 1180 to 1212 as Bernard III
 Hedwig (d. 1203), married to Otto II, Margrave of Meissen
 Daughter, married c. 1152 to Vladislav of Olomouc, the eldest son of Soběslav I, Duke of Bohemia
 Adelheid (died 1162), a nun in Lamspringe
 Gertrude, married in 1155 to Duke Diepold of Moravia
 Sybille (died c. 1170), Abbess of Quedlinburg
 Eilika

References

Works cited

General references

External links

Thomas Carlyle, History of Friedrich ii Chapter iv: Albert the Bear
The History Files: Rulers of Brandenburg

 
 

 
 

Albert 00
Margraves of Brandenburg
Counts of Anhalt
People from Brandenburg an der Havel
Christians of the Wendish Crusade
1100s births
Place of birth unknown
1170 deaths